The 1997–98 Danish Cup was the 44th installment of the Danish Cup, the highest football competition in Denmark.

Final

References

1997-98
1997–98 domestic association football cups
Cup